Adi Prag (עדי פרג; born December 15, 1957) is an Israeli former Olympic swimmer.

Swimming career
He competed for Israel at the 1974 Asian Games in Tehran, Iran, in swimming in the 100 m and 200 m butterfly (coming in 4th in both), in the 200 m freestyle (coming in 5th), in the 100 m freestyle (coming in 6th), and in the 200 m individual medley.

Prag represented Israel at the 1976 Summer Olympics in  Montreal, Quebec, Canada, in swimming, at the age of 18. He was the youngest Israeli competitor at the 1976 Games.  He competed in the Men's 100 metre butterfly, and came in 6th in Heat 1.  He also competed in the Men's 200 metre butterfly, and came in 5th in Heat 2.

References

External links
 

Living people
Swimmers at the 1976 Summer Olympics
1957 births
Israeli male swimmers
Swimmers at the 1974 Asian Games
Olympic swimmers of Israel
Asian Games competitors for Israel